World Destruction League: Thunder Tanks is a car combat shooter game that has a similar gameplay to the Twisted Metal and Vigilante 8 series.

Gameplay
Like Twisted Metal and Vigilante 8, the player must obtain "powerups" and defeat enemy vehicles, but must capture the enemy flags in order to win. However, all of the vehicles are tanks, hence its name. The game itself is short, making it quite unpopular among gamers. It was also one of the first PlayStation 2 titles to be released. It is considered a spiritual successor to the Battletanx series, since it has similar gameplay to that as well, and is made by the same company, The 3DO Company. Also a mototank from Battletanx: Global Assault can be seen in the opening title sequence, and many of the playable tanks are inspired or directly copied from Battletanx. A reversed M-80 (only in the PS1 version of Battletanx: Global Assault) can also be seen in game as the unplayable AI controlled Skorpion Bomb Tank.

Reception

The PlayStation 2 version received "mixed" reviews, while the PlayStation version received "unfavorable" reviews, according to the review aggregation website Metacritic. Emmett Schkloven of NextGen said in its January 2001 issue that the latter console version was "Not even worth the price of gas it would take to drive to the video store to rent it." Three issues later, Eric Bratcher said that the former console version "fails to innovate. It misses the brass ring simply because it doesn't bother reaching for it."

References

External links

2000 video games
Game Boy Color games
PlayStation (console) games
PlayStation 2 games
The 3DO Company games
Tank simulation video games
Vehicular combat games
Video games developed in the United States
Multiplayer and single-player video games